Western Dakota Technical Institute is a public community college in Rapid City, South Dakota. It has an enrollment of 1,324 and offers 26 associate degree programs.

References

External links 
 

Community colleges in South Dakota
Two-year colleges in the United States
Education in Rapid City, South Dakota